Sinlap is a circular depression on Titan, a natural satellite of Saturn.

Characteristics 
Sinlap is centred at 11,3° latitude north and 16,0° longitude west, and measures 80 km in diameter.

Observation 
Sinlap was discovered by the images transmitted by the Cassini–Huygens space research mission.

It is named after a Jingpo spirit.

References 

Surface features of Titan (moon)